The Mapo Bridge crosses the Han River in South Korea and connects the Mapo District and the Yeongdeungpo District in the city of Seoul. The bridge was completed in 1970. Until 1984, the bridge was called Seoul Bridge.

Suicides
The suicide rate is very high in South Korea and bridge jumping is common. Mapo Bridge has a reputation of jumpers with over 100 attempts in between 2007 and 2012.

On July 26, 2013, Sung Jae-ki jumped off Mapo Bridge in an attempt to draw attention to gender inequality against men and a plea to accrue needed funds for "Men of Korea". Although rescue work began almost immediately after he fell and a widespread search of the Han River was conducted, it took three days to retrieve his body.

In an effort to deter suicides on the bridge, Samsung Life Insurance added pictures, words, and a statue that were intended to foster an encouraging atmosphere. For instance, the bridge's handrails were equipped with motion sensors to sense movement, lighting up with short phrases (written with the help of suicide prevention specialists and psychologists), also showing photos of happy families among other things.

However, such measures were deemed to be a failure in 2015 and Samsung eventually replaced the lights and slogans with barriers in a return to a more physical approach to suicide prevention by October.

Gallery

See also 
 Sung Jae-ki

References

Bridges in Seoul
Bridges completed in 1970